Wrightia demartiniana is a plant in the dogbane family Apocynaceae.

Description
Its fragrant flowers feature a white or creamy corolla. Local traditional medicinal uses include the treatment of kidney problems, gonorrhoea and as a laxative.

Distribution and habitat
Wrightia demartiniana is native to Ethiopia, Somalia and Kenya. Its habitat is bushland from  altitude.

References

demartiniana
Plants used in traditional African medicine
Flora of Ethiopia
Flora of Somalia
Flora of Kenya
Plants described in 1915